In 1918–1920, a series of violent fights took place in the city of Split between Croats and Italians, culminating in a struggle on 11 July 1920 that resulted in the deaths of Captain Tommaso Gulli of the Italian protected cruiser , Croat civilian Matej Miš, and Italian sailor Aldo Rossi. The incidents were the cause of the destruction in Trieste of the Slovenian Cultural Centre by Italian Fascists.

Background

The confrontations were the product of a centuries-long struggle for the control of the eastern coast of the Adriatic Sea between South Slavs and Italians. 
During the second half of the 19th century Split saw antagonism between the pro-Italian Autonomist Party and the pro-Yugoslav People's Party.

Hostilities between the two ethnicities increased after the fall of the Austro-Hungarian Empire, when Italian irredentists called for the annexation of several formerly Austro-Hungarian cities on the eastern coast of the Adriatic Sea, which were home to both South Slavs and Italians, into Italy, and occupied several of them by force.

Population

According to the 1910 census the population of Split numbered 20,275, of which 18,176 (85.18%) were Croats or Serbs (Croats were the majority, but the census made no distinction between the two), while 2,082 (9.73%) were Italians.

In the city of Split there was an autochthonous Italian community, which was reorganized in November 1918 through the foundation of the "National Fasces" (not related to fascism) led by Leonardo Pezzoli, Antonio Tacconi, Edoardo Pervan and Stefano Selem, former members of the Autonomist Party, which had been dissolved by the Austrian authorities in 1915.

This census data had understated the number of Italians in the city area and this mistake seems to be confirmed by a series of subsequent events. Indeed, following the Treaty of Rapallo, the Italians of Dalmatia could opt for the acquisition of Italian citizenship instead of the Yugoslavian one, while maintaining residence: despite a violent campaign of intimidation on the part of Yugoslavia, over 900 families of Italian speaking "Spalatini" had exercised the option to be Italians. Furthermore, a Census of Italians living outside Italy was carried out in 1927: in Spalato and surrounding area 3,337 Italian citizens were counted.

According to Antonio Tacconi, given that about 1,000 Italians left the city following its incorporation into the Kingdom of Serbs, Croats and Slovenes and estimating that a certain percentage of Italians accepted the Yugoslavian citizenship, it is possible to estimate the Italian population of Split in 1918/1919 in 7.000 people. This number is obtained by analyzing the membership in Italian associations of Spalato in 1918/1919. This amount is more than 3 times the data from the 1910 Austrian Census.

History

After the Austrian defeat, in the first half of November 1918 Italian troops unilaterally occupied territories of Austria-Hungary promised to Italy by the secret 1915 Pact of London. Split was not one of those areas and was placed under Allied military occupation; the Italians sent two warships - the torpedo boat Riboty and the protected cruiser  - while the Italian minority publicly demanded the annexation of the city into Italy, supported by some Italian political circles. At the same time, Croats formed the National Guard, a local militia to guarantee public order.

On 9 November 1918, two French destroyers entered the port of Split. The Italians displayed the flag of Italy in the windows of their homes to give the impression citizens supported Italy's bid for annexation. This however incited a riot and the flags were torn down. The commander of a former Austrian ship already docked at the port ordered the removal of the flags. Other incidents and demonstrations against Italy happened in other cities, like Trogir and the Kaštela. Italian Admiral Enrico Millo, appointed temporary military commander for the parts of Dalmatia occupied by Italy, unilaterally dispatched Italian naval vessels to the city. On 12 January, Puglia arrived among large protests.

On 12 September 1919, Gabriele D'Annunzio led around 2,600 rebel troops from the Italian Army - some units of the Sardinia Grenadiers - Italian nationalists and irredentists to seize the Adriatic port city of Fiume, forcing the withdrawal of the inter-Allied (American, British, Italian and French) occupying forces, and later proceeding south to occupy the Dalmatian city of Zara. As a consequence armed nationalist irregulars commanded by Dalmatian Italian Count Fanfogna proceeded further south to Split's neighbouring city of Trogir and organized a similar occupation, quickly nipped by the Allies. In Split, located just south across the Kaštela Bay from Trogir, the citizens feared their (significantly larger) city would be next in line, and that the joint Allied military administration would once again stand aside while another Dalmatian city came under the control of armed Italian nationalist irregulars.

27 January Split incident

The fear of an annexation by Italy led to a violent attitude by some members of the Croat majority towards the Italian minority; both in Split and Trogir, Italians were assaulted in several instances and their property damaged, especially after Fanfogna's attempt to seize Trogir. The most serious incident happened on 27 January 1920, after the Allies had sent to Belgrade an unwelcome note about the settlement of the new Italian-Yugoslav border. A public rally against Italian imperialism was organized, but it ended in an assault on the offices of some Italian associations and about twenty Italian shops, whose signs, shutters and windows were shattered.

11 July Split incident
On 11 July 1920, street conflict erupted between Italians and Croats. Accounts diverge about the cause of these clashes: according to Croat sources, they were triggered by the removal of a Yugoslav flag by two officers from Puglia; according to Italian sources, they were started by people who had just attended to a conference held by a Croat nationalist.

During the riots, a group of officers of Puglia found refuge in a place near the docks: captain Gulli ordered a boat under the command of lieutenant Gallo to rescue them, but it was blocked by the crowd. Gallo then fired "warning shots" into the air.<ref>G.Menini, Passione adriatica. p.207</ref> Soon captain Gulli went ashore himself on a motorboat, but on approaching the docks found a large crowd and shots were exchanged. A hand grenade thrown at the vessel fatally wounded sailor Aldo Rossi and hurt several others. A civilian in the crowd, Matej Miš, was shot and killed, and Captain Gulli was also hit by a shot, dying the next day. In Italy the reaction to what happened in Split was indignation, while in the city of Trieste (another former Austro-Hungarian annexed by Italy) Italian proto-fascists and nationalists destroyed the Trieste National Hall (Narodni dom), the center of the Slovene theatre in Trieste and other activities.

See also

 History of Dalmatia

Notes

Bibliography

 Dalbello M.C.; Razza antonello. Per una storia delle comunità italiane della Dalmazia. Fondazione Culturale Maria ed Eugenio Dario Rustia Traine. Trieste, 2004.
 Lederer, Ivo. La Jugoslavia dalla conferenza di pace al trattato di Rapallo 1919–1920. Il Saggiatore. Milano, 1964.
 Menini, Giulio. Passione adriatica. Ricordi di Dalmazia 1918–1920. Zanichelli. Bologna, 1925.
 Monzali, Luciano. Antonio Tacconi e la comunità italiana di Spalato. Editore Scuola Dalmata dei SS. Giorgio e Trifone. Venezia, 2007.
 Monzali, Luciano. Italiani di Dalmazia. 1914–1924 Le Lettere Firenze, 2007.
 Salza, Silvio. La marina italiana nella grande guerra (Vol. VIII). Vallecchi. Firenze, 1942.
 Tacconi, Ildebrando. La grande esclusa: Spalato cinquanta anni fa'' (in "Per la Dalmazia con amore e con angoscia"). Editore Del Bianco, Udine, 1994

External links
 Gli incidenti di Spalato 1, in Prassi italiana di diritto internazionale, 1426/3 (in Italian)
 L'incidente di Spalato 2, in Prassi italiana di diritto internazionale, 1416/3 (in Italian)
 L'incidente di Spalato e reazione a Trieste, in Prassi italiana di diritto internazionale, 1356/3 (in Italian)
 

1918 in Croatia
1918 in Italy
Italian irredentism
Italy–Yugoslavia relations
1920 in Croatia
1920 in Italy
Conflicts in 1919
Conflicts in 1920
20th century in Split, Croatia
Adriatic question